Sergei Lavrentyevich Makarenko (born 11 September 1937) is a retired Soviet sprint canoeist who competed from late 1950s to early 1960s. Together with Leonid Geishtor he won the C-2 1000 m event at the 1960 Olympics and 1963 World Championships.

References

External links
DatabaseOlympics.com profile

1937 births
Canoeists at the 1960 Summer Olympics
Living people
Olympic canoeists of the Soviet Union
Olympic gold medalists for the Soviet Union
Soviet male canoeists
Ukrainian male canoeists
Olympic medalists in canoeing
Sportspeople from Kryvyi Rih
ICF Canoe Sprint World Championships medalists in Canadian
Medalists at the 1960 Summer Olympics
Spartak athletes